Liu Song is a male table tennis player from Argentina. From 1998 to 2011 he won several medals in singles, doubles, and team events in the Latin American Table Tennis Championships.

Biography

Personal life
Born in Guangxi, China he started practising table tennis at the age of nine. He studied in a special school for athletes and reached eighth place in China's national ranking. Between 1990 and 1994 he was a part of China's national team, and he won the national junior single's championship in 1991. In 1986 he started studying marketing in the University of Tokyo, although he dropped it after a year after deciding to go to Argentina. That's why it is said that Liu has three nationalities (Chinese, Argentinian and Japanese). In 1990 his family moved to Argentina, living in Floresta, a neighborhood in Buenos Aires city, where they opened a laundry. Five years later, Song followed his family. He adopted Argentinian nationality, the country that he always represented at international level, and he started training in the Centro Nacional de Alto Rendimiento Deportivo.

International career
His first big accomplishment was in 1995 in Brazil's Open; in 1996 he reached the semi-finals of the US Open, in the United States. He won all the Argentinian championships between 1995 and 2001, but in 1997 he started to alternate his place of residence between Argentina and Europe to play professionally. In the season of 1997/98 he was team's champion in Germany's second division; after that he played in Croatia, where he was team's champion in the first division in 1999 and 2001, and he won the European Championship team's in 2000 and 2001 playing for Zagreb. Then he went to Bordeaux, France, where he lives since 2001, playing for local team SAG Cestas in France's first division. Liu won the bronze medal in the 2011 Latin American Cup held in Rio de Janeiro, Brazil, after being defeated by Brazil's Gustavo Tsuboi 4–3. Almost at the end of his career, being 39 years old, he won the singles' gold medal at the 2011 Pan American Games in Guadalajara, Mexico, by beating Mexico's Marcos Madrid in the final.

See also
 List of table tennis players

References

External links

Living people
1972 births
Table tennis players from Guangxi
Chinese emigrants to Argentina
Naturalized citizens of Argentina
Naturalised table tennis players
People who lost Chinese citizenship
Chinese male table tennis players
Argentine male table tennis players
Olympic table tennis players of Argentina
Pan American Games gold medalists for Argentina
Pan American Games silver medalists for Argentina
Pan American Games bronze medalists for Argentina
Table tennis players at the 2000 Summer Olympics
Table tennis players at the 2004 Summer Olympics
Table tennis players at the 2007 Pan American Games
Table tennis players at the 2008 Summer Olympics
Table tennis players at the 2011 Pan American Games
Table tennis players at the 2012 Summer Olympics
Pan American Games medalists in table tennis
South American Games gold medalists for Argentina
South American Games silver medalists for Argentina
South American Games bronze medalists for Argentina
South American Games medalists in table tennis
Competitors at the 2006 South American Games
Table tennis players at the 1999 Pan American Games
Table tennis players at the 2003 Pan American Games
Medalists at the 1999 Pan American Games
Medalists at the 2003 Pan American Games
Medalists at the 2007 Pan American Games
Medalists at the 2011 Pan American Games